Coleophora samarensis is a moth of the family Coleophoridae. It is found in southern Russia.

References

samarensis
Moths of Europe
Moths described in 2001